Tony Graham may refer to:

Tony Graham (cyclist) (born 1962), New Zealand cyclist
Tony Graham (New Zealand footballer), New Zealand international football (soccer) player
Tony Graham (rugby league) (born 1950s), Australian rugby player
Tony Graham (soccer) (born 1956), American professional football (soccer) player
Tony Graham (tennis) (born 1956), former professional tennis player from the United States
Tony Graham (swimmer), former swimming representative from New Zealand